Ellen R. Bromberg is an American dance scholar, currently a Distinguished Professor at University of Utah's School of Dance.

References

University of Utah faculty
American filmmakers
American female dancers
American dancers
Living people
Place of birth missing (living people)
Year of birth missing (living people)
American women academics
21st-century American women